Jeb Allen Huckeba (born May 20, 1982) is an American football defensive end.  He played in the first ever U.S. Army All-American Bowl on December 30, 2000.  Huckeba played at Harding Academy (Searcy, Arkansas) before choosing to play for the Arkansas Razorbacks under then head coach Houston Nutt. Huckeba went on to be drafted by the Seattle Seahawks of the NFL, where he played for two seasons.

References
NFL.com - Historical players – Jeb Huckeba

1982 births
American football defensive ends
Arkansas Razorbacks football players
Living people
People from Searcy, Arkansas
Players of American football from Arkansas
Seattle Seahawks players